Hey Clockface is the 31st studio album by English singer-songwriter Elvis Costello, released on 30 October 2020 by Concord Records.

Critical reception

Hey Clockface received generally positive reviews from critics. At Metacritic, which assigns a normalized rating out of 100 to reviews from critics, the album received an average score of 78, which indicates "generally favorable reviews", based on 9 reviews.

Stephen Thomas Erlewine of AllMusic gave Hey Clockface a positive 4-star review, stating that the record shows "Costello's mastery of mood and storytelling". Writing for Pitchfork, Daniel Felsenthal noted that Hey Clockface merges the "potentially divergent sensibilities" of "driving, ageless rock" and "conventions of the American songbook" into "an adventurous set of songs about time's ceaseless march....Alone, either style might have seemed like predictable genre play for Costello at this stage in his career, but together, they make for an album that's energetic and consistently surprising."

Track listing

Personnel
Helsinki recordings (tracks 2, 6, 9)
Elvis Costello – all voices and instruments

Paris recordings (tracks 1, 3, 5, 7, 8, 10, 11, 13, 14)
Elvis Costello – voice, guitar, snare drum, bass, piano
Le Quintette Saint Germain:
Steve Nieve – grand piano, upright piano, organ, mellotron, melodica
Mickaël Gasche – trumpet, flugelhorn, serpent
Renaud-Gabriel Pion – contrabass clarinet, bass clarinet, Bb clarinet, tenor saxophone, bass flute, cor Anglais 
Pierre-François "Titi" Dufour – cello, foot stomps
AJUQ – drums, percussion, harmonies

New York recordings (tracks 4 and 12)
Elvis Costello – voice via electrical wire
Michael Leonhart – trumpet, drums, guitar, synthesizer, bass, organ, trombone, piano, surdu
Bill Frisell – guitar, loops
Nels Cline – guitar
Nick Movshon – drums
Emily Hope-Price – cello
Chris Bullock – alto flute
Danton Boller – acoustic bass fill

Charts

References

External links
 

2020 albums
Concord Records albums
Elvis Costello albums